The Saint Xavier University Cougars is an athletic team of Saint Xavier University located in Chicago, IL. The program is a part of the National Association of Intercollegiate Athletics (NAIA) and the Chicagoland Collegiate Athletic Conference (CCAC). The Cougars host their home games at the Shannon Center located in Chicago, IL.

The women's basketball program is coached by the Athletic Director of Saint Xavier Bob Hallberg. Coach Hallberg with be entering this program for the 16th season. He is accompanied by Assistant Coach Barry Shaw who is also entering his 16th season of coaching alongside Assistant Coach Jay Battles in his 8th season for the Cougars.

The 2015-2016 Cougars started their season with a 7-0 overall record and a 2-0 Conference record (as of November 23, 2015). The Cougars opened the season traveling to Milwaukee, Wisconsin to the Cardinal Stritch University Tournament to play Asbury University in early November. The Cougars fought hard and came out with a win 83-75 over the Eagles. They had a game against Governors State University the following day. The Jaguars recently entered the CCAC  this year, the Cougars won by 95-48. 

Saint Xavier traveled to Bourbonnais, Ill. the following weekend to Olivet Nazarene University for the ONU Classic. Tough fight against Marian University (Indiana) led the Cougars to victory of 81-67. The Cougars were losing 54-38 in the 3rd quarter, but soon Saint Xavier picked up their shots and had a lead by one in the beginning of the 4th quarter. Threes by Kara Krolicki and Mikayla Leyden were enough to hold the Knights at the end of the game. With a big win against Marian, the Cougars faced Bethel College the next day, winning 95-62. Saint Xavier dominated the ONU Classic and was named the Championship Team out of all four teams that participated. Saint Xavier went on the road to Deerfield, Ill. to face Trinity International University  in the first CCAC game of the season. Trojans fought hard, but the Cougars stepped up to the court with a 76-54 win over Trinity. Back in Chicago the next night, the Cougars have their first home game of the season in a non-conference match up against Taylor University  on Bob Hallberg's Court. Trojans could not beat the Cougars on their home court, losing 75-55.

In the conference game against Indiana University South Bend. five Cougars received double figures as they defeated the Titans 89-57. Just before Thanksgiving Break, the Cougars faced the Robert Morris University Illinois Eagles at home with an 81-57 final score. Junior guard Mikayla Leyden missed a triple double as she helped the Cougars with 11 points, 11 assists, and 9 rebounds. Krolicki, Collins, and Prasse all incorporated double digits by the end of the game to help the win for Saint Xavier. With no day in between the Cougars faced Indiana University Northwest Titans the following day at 3pm. The Titans put up a good fight with a 24-24 score at halftime. The Cougars fought hard in the third quarter. With the help of senior center Caitlin McMahon, scoring her career high of 20 points, the Cougars defeated the Titans 92-67. Saint Xavier faced Roosevelt University on Saturday, December 6. Saint Xavier increased their winning streak to 17-0 with the 79-55 win over Roosevelt. Vozel recorded 15 boards against the Lakers.

2015-2016 Roster 

Saint Xavier University
Women's basketball teams in the United States
Women's sports in Illinois